A frenulum (or frenum, plural: frenula or frena, from the Latin frēnulum, "little bridle", the diminutive of frēnum) is a small fold of tissue that secures the motion of a mobile organ in the body.

In human anatomy 

Frenula on the human body include several in the mouth, some in the digestive tract, and some connected to the external genitalia.
Brain: Frenulum of superior medullary velum or frenulum veli
Digestive tract: frenulum valvae ileocaecalis
Oral tissue: Frenula of the mouth include the frenulum linguae under the tongue, the frenulum labii superioris inside the upper lip, the frenulum labii inferioris inside the lower lip, and the buccal frena which connect the cheeks to the gum. These can easily be torn by violent blows to the face or mouth, thus a torn frenulum is sometimes a warning sign of physical abuse. 
Penile tissue: The word frenulum on its own is often used for the frenulum of prepuce of penis or frenulum preputii penis, which is an elastic band of tissue under the glans penis that connects to the prepuce (foreskin) to the vernal mucosa, and helps contract the prepuce over the glans.
Vulvular tissue: In females, genital frenula include the frenulum clitoridis of the clitoris and the frenulum labiorum pudendi (fourchette) where the labia minora meet at the back.

An overly short oral or genital frenulum may require a frenulectomy or frenuloplasty to achieve normal mobility.

In insects
The word frenulum also refers to a bristle present at the root of the hindwing of most moths which engages with a small hook or tuft on the forewing (the retinaculum) to join the wings together.

See also
 Frenectomy – surgical removal of frenula
 Frenuloplasty – surgical alterations of frenula
 Frenulum breve
 Frenulum of labia minora
 Frenulum of lower lip
 Frenulum veli

Piercings
 Frenum piercing
 Lip frenulum piercing
 Tongue frenulum piercing

References

External links
 

Tissues (biology)
Insect anatomy